Studentersamfundet or Studentersamfunnet can refer to one of several Norwegian student societies:

The Student Society in Trondheim (Studentersamfundet i Trondhjem) in Trondheim
The Norwegian Students' Society (Det Norske Studentersamfund) in Oslo

Studentersamfundet may also refer to the following Danish student organisations:

 , a leftist breakaway group from the Studenterforeningen